William 'Tip' Brown (27 June 1874 – 6 January 1940) was an English amateur footballer and minor counties cricketer.

Brown was born at Luton in June 1874 to William Brown and his wife, Martha. By profession a hat manufacturer, he played for Luton Town in three spells between 1892 and 1904, making 59 appearances and scoring ten goals during his second-spell. In between his three spells, he played for St Albans City from 1895–1899 and Watford from 1901–1904. Brown also played cricket at minor counties level for Bedfordshire, albeit intermittently, from 1904–1914, making sixteen appearances in the Minor Counties Championship. During the Second World War he was employed as a special constable in Luton. He fell ill on 4 January 1940, subsequently dying two days later.

References

1874 births
1940 deaths
Footballers from Luton
British milliners
English footballers
Association football forwards
Association football midfielders
Luton Town F.C. players
St Albans City F.C. players
Watford F.C. players
English cricketers
Bedfordshire cricketers
British special constables